The fin whale (Balaenoptera physalus), also known as finback whale or common rorqual and formerly known as herring whale or razorback whale, is a cetacean belonging to the parvorder of baleen whales. It is the second-longest species of cetacean on Earth after the blue whale. American naturalist Roy Chapman Andrews called the fin whale "the greyhound of the sea ... for its beautiful, slender body is built like a racing yacht and the animal can surpass the speed of the fastest ocean steamship."

The fin whale's body is long and slender, coloured brownish-grey with a paler underside. At least two recognized subspecies exist, in the North Atlantic and the Southern Hemisphere. It is found in all the major oceans, from polar to tropical waters. It is absent only from waters close to the pack ice at the poles and relatively small areas of water away from the open ocean. The highest population density occurs in temperate and cool waters. Its food consists of small schooling fish, squid, and crustaceans including copepods and krill.

Like all other large whales, the fin whale was heavily hunted during the 20th century. As a result, it is an endangered species. Over 725,000 fin whales were reportedly taken from the Southern Hemisphere between 1905 and 1976; as of 1997 only 38,000 survived. Recovery of the overall population size of southern subspecies is predicted to be at less than 50% of its pre-whaling state by 2100 due to heavier impacts of whaling and slower recovery rates.

The International Whaling Commission (IWC) issued a moratorium on commercial hunting of this whale, although Iceland and Japan have resumed hunting. The species is also hunted by Greenlanders under the IWC's Aboriginal Subsistence Whaling provisions. Global population estimates range from less than 100,000 to roughly 119,000.
The fin whale is estimated to be the most common wild mammal species by total biomass, at about 8 million tons (only surpassed by humans and several domestic mammal species).

Taxonomy 

The fin whale was first described by Friderich Martens in 1675 and by Paul Dudley in 1725. The former description was used as the primary basis of the species Balaena physalus by Carl Linnaeus in 1758. In 1804, Bernard Germain de Lacépède reclassified the species as Balaenoptera rorqual, based on a specimen that had stranded on Île Sainte-Marguerite (Cannes, France) in 1798. In 1830, Louis Companyo described a specimen that had stranded near Saint-Cyprien, southern France, in 1828 as Balaena musculus. Most later authors followed him in using the specific name musculus, until Frederick W. True (1898) showed that it referred to the blue whale. In 1846, British taxonomist John Edward Gray described a  specimen from the Falkland Islands as Balaenoptera australis. In 1865, German naturalist Hermann Burmeister described a roughly  specimen found near Buenos Aires about 30 years earlier as Balaenoptera patachonicus. In 1903, Romanian scientist Emil Racoviță placed all these designations into Balaenoptera physalus. The word physalus comes from the Greek word physa, meaning "blows", referring to the prominent blow of the species.

Fin whales are rorquals, members of the family Balaenopteridae, which also includes the humpback whale, the blue whale, Bryde's whale, the sei whale, and the minke whales. The family diverged from the other baleen whales in the suborder Mysticeti as long ago as the middle Miocene.

Recent DNA evidence indicates the fin whale may be more closely related to the humpback whale (Megaptera novaeangliae) and in at least one study the gray whale (Eschrichtius robustus), two whales in different genera, than it is to members of its own genus, such as the minke whales. 
As of 2022, four subspecies are named, each with distinct physical features and vocalizations. The northern fin whale, B. p. physalus (Linnaeus 1758) inhabits the North Atlantic and the southern fin whale, B. p. quoyi (Fischer 1829) occupies the Southern Hemisphere. Most experts consider the fin whales of the North Pacific to be a third subspecies—this was supported by a 2013 study, which found that the Northern Hemisphere B. p. physalus was not composed of a single subspecies. A 2019 genetic study concluded that the North Pacific fin whales should be considered a subspecies, suggesting the name  B. p. velifera (Scammon 1869). The three groups mix at most rarely.

Clarke (2004) proposed a "pygmy" subspecies (B. p. patachonica, Burmeister, 1865) that is purportedly darker in colour and has black baleen. He based this on a single physically mature  female caught in the Antarctic in 1947–48, the smaller average size (a few feet) of sexually and physically mature fin whales caught by the Japanese around 50°S, and smaller, darker sexually immature fin whales caught in the Antarctic which he believed were a "migratory phase" of his proposed subspecies. The subspecies has not been genetically established, and is not recognized by the Society for Marine Mammalogy.

Hybrids 
The genetic distance between blue and fin whales has been compared to that between a gorilla and human (3.5 million years on the evolutionary tree.) Nevertheless, hybrid individuals between blue and fin whales with characteristics of both are known to occur with relative frequency in both the North Atlantic and North Pacific.

The DNA profile of a sampling of whale meat in the Japanese market found evidence of blue/fin hybrids.

Anatomy

Size 

In the North Atlantic, the longest reported were a 24.4 m (80 ft) male caught off Shetland in 1905 and a  female caught off Scotland sometime between 1908 and 1914, while the longest reliably measured were three 20.7 m (68 ft) males caught off Iceland in 1973–74 and a 22.5 m (74 ft) female also caught off Iceland in 1975.

In the North Pacific, the longest reported were three 22.9 m (75 ft) males, two caught off California between 1919 and 1926 and the other caught off Alaska in 1925, and a 24.7 m (81 ft) female also caught off California, while the longest reliably measured were a 21 m (69 ft) male caught off British Columbia in 1959 and a 22.9 m (75 ft) female caught off central California between 1959 and 1970.

In the Southern Hemisphere, the longest reported were a 25 m (82 ft) male and a 27.3 m (89.6 ft) female, while the longest measured by Mackintosh and Wheeler (1929) were a 22.65 m (74.3 ft) male and a 24.53 m (80.5 ft) female. Major F. A. Spencer, while whaling inspector of the factory ship Southern Princess (1936–38), confirmed the length of a  female caught in the Antarctic, south of the Indian Ocean; scientist David Edward Gaskin also measured a 25.9 m female as whaling inspector of the British factory ship Southern Venturer in the Southern Ocean in the 1961–62 season. Terence Wise, who worked as a winch operator aboard the British factory ship Balaena, claimed that "the biggest fin [he] ever saw" was a  specimen caught near Bouvet Island in January 1958. An individual at the maximum confirmed size of 25.9 m is estimated to weigh around 95 tonnes (104.5 tons), varying from about 76 tonnes (84 tons) to 114 tonnes (125.5 tons) depending on fat condition which varies by about 50% during the year.

Colouration and markings 

The fin whale is brownish to dark or light gray dorsally and white ventrally. The left side of the head is dark gray, while the right side exhibits a complex pattern of contrasting light and dark markings. On the right lower jaw is a white or light gray "right mandible patch", which sometimes extends out as a light "blaze" laterally and dorsally unto the upper jaw and back to just behind the blowholes. Two narrow dark stripes originate from the eye and ear, the former widening into a large dark area on the shoulder—these are separated by a light area called the "interstripe wash". These markings are more prominent on individuals in the North Atlantic than in the North Pacific, where they can appear indistinct. The left side exhibits similar but much fainter markings. Dark, oval-shaped areas of pigment called "flipper shadows" extend below and posterior to the pectoral fins. This type of asymmetry is seen in Omura's whale and occasionally in minke whales. It was thought to have evolved because the whale swims on its right side when surface lunging and it sometimes circles to the right while at the surface above a prey patch. However, the whales just as often circle to the left. No accepted hypothesis explains the asymmetry.
It has paired blowholes and a broad, flat, V-shaped rostrum. A light V-shaped marking, the chevron, begins behind the blowholes and extends back and then forward again.

The whale has a series of 56–100 pleats or grooves along the bottom of the body that run from the tip of the chin to the navel that allow the throat area to expand greatly during feeding. Its flippers are small and tapered and its tail is wide, pointed at the tip, and notched in the centre.

When the whale surfaces, the dorsal fin is visible soon after the spout.

Nervous system 
The oral cavity of the fin whale has a very stretchy or extensible nerve system which aids them in feeding.

Life history 

Mating occurs in temperate, low-latitude seas during the winter, followed by an 11- to 12-month gestation period. Females reproduce every 2 or 3 years, with as many as six fetuses being reported, but single births are far more common. Calves remain with their mothers for about one year.

Full physical maturity is attained between 25 and 30 years. Fin whales have a maximum life span of at least 94 years of age, although specimens have been found aged at an estimated 135–140 years.

Fin whales are more gregarious than other rorquals, and often live in groups of 6–10, although feeding groups may reach up to 100 animals.

Vocalizations 

Like other whales, males make long, loud, low-frequency sounds. The vocalizations of blue and fin whales are the lowest-frequency sounds made by any animal. Most sounds are frequency-modulated (FM) down-swept infrasonic pulses from 16 to 40 hertz frequency (the range of sounds that most humans can hear falls between 20 hertz and 20 kilohertz). Each sound lasts one to two seconds, and various sound combinations occur in patterned sequences lasting 7 to 15 minutes each. The whale then repeats the sequences in bouts lasting up to many days. The vocal sequences have source levels of up to 184–186 decibels relative to 1 micropascal at a reference distance of one metre and can be detected hundreds of miles from their source.

When fin whale sounds were first recorded by US biologists, they did not realize that these unusually loud, long, pure and regular sounds were being made by whales. They first investigated the possibilities that the sounds were due to equipment malfunction, geophysical phenomena, or even part of a Soviet Union scheme for detecting enemy submarines. Eventually, biologists demonstrated that the sounds were the vocalizations of fin whales.

Direct association of these vocalizations with the reproductive season for the species and that only males make the sounds point to these vocalizations as possible reproductive displays. Over the past 100 years, the dramatic increase in ocean noise from shipping and naval activity may have slowed the recovery of the fin whale population, by impeding communications between males and receptive females.

Fin whale songs can penetrate over 2,500 m (8,200 ft) below the sea floor and seismologists can use those song waves to assist in underwater surveys.

Breathing 

When feeding, they blow five to seven times in quick succession, but while traveling or resting will blow once every minute or two. On their terminal (last) dive they arch their back high out of the water, but rarely raise their flukes out of the water. They then dive to depths of up to  when feeding or a few hundred feet when resting or traveling. The average feeding dive off California and Baja lasts 6 minutes, with a maximum of 17 minutes; when traveling or resting they usually dive for only a few minutes at a time.

Ecology

Range and habitat 
Like many large rorquals, the fin whale is a cosmopolitan species. It is found in all the world's major oceans and in waters ranging from the polar to the tropical. It is absent only from waters close to the ice pack at both the north and south extremities and relatively small areas of water away from the large oceans, such as the Red Sea, although they can reach into the Baltic Sea, a marginal sea of such conditions. The highest population density occurs in temperate and cool waters. It is less densely populated in the warmest, equatorial regions. 

The North Atlantic fin whale has an extensive distribution, occurring from the Gulf of Mexico and Mediterranean Sea, northward to Baffin Bay and Spitsbergen. In general, fin whales are more common north of approximately 30°N latitude, but considerable confusion arises about their occurrence south of 30°N latitude because of the difficulty in distinguishing fin whales from Bryde's whales. Extensive ship surveys have led researchers to conclude that the summer feeding range of fin whales in the western North Atlantic is mainly between 41°20'N and 51°00'N, from shore seaward to the  contour.

Summer distribution of fin whales in the North Pacific is the immediate offshore waters from central Baja California to Japan and as far north as the Chukchi Sea bordering the Arctic Ocean. They occur in high densities in the northern Gulf of Alaska and southeastern Bering Sea between May and October, with some movement through the Aleutian passes into and out of the Bering Sea. Several whales tagged between November and January off southern California were killed in the summer off central California, Oregon, British Columbia, and in the Gulf of Alaska. Fin whales have been observed feeding 250 miles south of Hawaii in mid-May, and several winter sightings have been made there. Some researchers have suggested that the whales migrate into Hawaiian waters primarily in the autumn and winter.

Although fin whales are certainly migratory, moving seasonally in and out of high-latitude feeding areas, the overall migration pattern is not well understood. Acoustic readings from passive-listening hydrophone arrays indicate a southward migration of the North Atlantic fin whale occurs in the autumn from the Labrador-Newfoundland region, south past Bermuda, and into the West Indies. One or more populations of fin whales are thought to remain year-round in high latitudes, moving offshore, but not southward in late autumn. A study based on resightings of identified fin whales in Massachusetts Bay indicates that calves often learn migratory routes from their mothers and return to their mother's feeding area in subsequent years.

In the Pacific, migration patterns are poorly characterized. Although some fin whales are apparently present year-round in the Gulf of California, there is a significant increase in their numbers in the winter and spring. Southern fin whales migrate seasonally from relatively high-latitude Antarctic feeding grounds in the summer to low-latitude breeding and calving areas in the winter. The location of winter breeding areas is still unknown, since these whales tend to migrate in the open ocean.

Population and trends

North Atlantic 

North Atlantic fin whales are defined by the International Whaling Commission to exist in one of seven discrete population zones: Nova Scotia-New England, Newfoundland-Labrador, western Greenland, eastern Greenland-Iceland, North Norway, West Norway-Faroe Islands, and Ireland-Spain-United Kingdom-Portugal. Results of mark-and-recapture surveys have indicated that some movement occurs across the boundaries of these zones, suggesting that they are not entirely discrete and that some immigration and emigration does occur. Sigurjónsson estimated in 1995 that total pre-exploitation population size in the entire North Atlantic ranged between 50,000 and 100,000 animals, but his research is criticized for lack of supporting data and an explanation of his reasoning. In 1977, D.E. Sergeant suggested a "primeval" aggregate total of 30,000 to 50,000 throughout the North Atlantic. Of that number, 8,000 to 9,000 would have resided in the Newfoundland and Nova Scotia areas, with whales summering in U.S. waters south of Nova Scotia presumably omitted. J. M. Breiwick estimated that the "exploitable" (above the legal size limit of 50 feet) component of the Nova Scotia population was 1,500 to 1,600 animals in 1964, reduced to only about 325 in 1973. Two aerial surveys in Canadian waters since the early 1970s gave numbers of 79 to 926 whales on the eastern Newfoundland-Labrador shelf in August 1980, and a few hundred in the northern and central Gulf of Saint Lawrence in August 1995 – 1996. Summer estimates in the waters off western Greenland range between 500 and 2,000, and in 1974, Jonsgard considered the fin whales off Western Norway and the Faroe Islands to "have been considerably depleted in postwar years, probably by overexploitation". The population around Iceland appears to have fared much better, and in 1981, appeared to have undergone only a minor decline since the early 1960s. Surveys during the summers of 1987 and 1989 estimated of 10,000 to 11,000 between eastern Greenland and Norway. This shows a substantial recovery when compared to a survey in 1976 showing an estimate of 6,900, which was considered to be a "slight" decline since 1948. A Spanish NASS survey in 1989 of the France-Portugal-Spain sub-area estimated a summer population range at 17,355.

A possible resident group was in waters off the Cape Verde Islands in 2000 and 2001.

Mediterranean Sea 

Satellite tracking revealed that those found in Pelagos Sanctuary migrate southward to off Tunisia, Malta, Pantelleria, and Sicily, and also possibly winter off coastal southern Italy, Sardinia, within the Strait of Messina, Aeolian Islands, and off Catalonia, Cabrera Archipelago, Libya, Kerkennah Islands, Tuscan Archipelago, Ischia and adjacent gulfs (e.g. Naples and Pozzuoli), winter feeding ground of Lampedusa, and whales may recolonize out of the Ligurian Sea to other areas such as in Ionian and in Adriatic Sea. Biology of the species along southern and southeastern parts of the basin such as off Libya, Algeria, and northern Egypt, is unclear due to lacks of scientific approaches although whales have been confirmed off the furthermost of the basin such as along in shore waters of Levantine Sea including Israel, Lebanon, and Cyprus. Documented records within Turkish waters have been in very small numbers; one sighting off Antalya in 1994 and five documented strandings as of 2016. and a recent sighting on 9 February 2021 by fishermen off the coast of Adana has been documented with images.

It has been shown that populations of Fin whales within the mediterranean have preferred feeding locations that partially overlap with high concentrations of plastic pollution and microplastic debris. High concentrations of microplastics most likely overlap with Fin whales preferred feeding grounds because both microplastic and the whale's food sources are in close proximity to high trophic upwelling areas.

North Pacific 

The total historical North Pacific population was estimated at 42,000 to 45,000 before the start of whaling. Of this, the population in the eastern portion of the North Pacific was estimated to be 25,000 to 27,000. By 1975, the estimate had declined to between 8,000 and 16,000. Surveys conducted in 1991, 1993, 1996, and 2001 produced estimates between 1,600 and 3,200 off California and 280 and 380 off Oregon and Washington. The minimum estimate for the California-Oregon-Washington population, as defined in the U.S. Pacific Marine Mammal Stock Assessments: 2005, is about 2,500. Surveys in coastal waters of British Columbia in summers 2004 and 2005 produced abundance estimates of approximately 500 animals. Surveys near the Pribilof Islands in the Bering Sea indicated a substantial increase in the local abundance of fin whales between 1975–1978 and 1987–1989. In 1984, the entire population was estimated to be less than 38% of its historic carrying capacity. Fin whales might have started returning to the coastal waters off British Columbia (a sighting occurred in Johnstone Strait in 2011) and Kodiak Island. Size of the local population migrating to Hawaiian Archipelago is unknown. Historically, several other wintering grounds were scattered in the North Pacific in the past, such as off the Northern Mariana Islands, Bonin Islands, and Ryukyu Islands. There was a sighting of 3 animals nearby Borneo and Palawan in 1999.

For Asian stocks, resident groups may exist in the Yellow Sea and East China Sea, and the Sea of Japan (though these populations are critically endangered and the population off China, Korea, and Japan are either near extinction or in very small numbers). Very small increases in sightings have been confirmed off Shiretoko Peninsula, Abashiri, Kushiro, Tsushima, and Sado Island. off Maiduru

Studies of historical catches suggest several resident groups once existed in the North Pacific—the Baja California group and the Yellow Sea–East China Sea (including Ryukyu Islands and western Kyusyu) group. Additionally, respective groups in northern Sea of Japan and the group along Pacific coasts of Japan from Hokkaido to Sanriku might have been resident or less migratory, as well. The only modern record among Ryukyu Islands was of a rotten carcass beached on Ishigaki Island in 2005. Regarding Yellow Sea, a juvenile was accidentally killed along Boryeong in 2014.

There had been congregation areas among Sea of Japan to Yellow Sea such as in East Korea Bay, along eastern coasts of Korean Peninsula, and Ulleungdo.

Modern sightings around the Commander Islands have been annual but not in great numbers, and whales likely to migrate through the areas rather than summering, and possible mixing of western and eastern populations are expected to occur in this waters.

South Pacific 

Very little information has been revealed about the ecology of current migration from Antarctic waters are unknown, but small increases in sighting rates are confirmed off New Zealand, such as off Kaikoura, and wintering grounds may exist in further north such as in Papua New Guinea, Fiji, and off East Timor. Confirmations in Rarotonga have been increased recently where interactions with humpback whales occur on occasions. Finbacks are also relatively abundant along the coast of Peru and Chile (in Chile, most notably off Los Lagos region such as Gulf of Corcovado in Chiloé National Park, port of Mejillones, and Caleta Zorra. Year-round confirmations indicate possible residents off pelagic north eastern to central Chile such as around coastal  and Pingüino de Humboldt National Reserve, east of Juan Fernández Islands, and northeast of Easter Island and possible wintering ground exist for eastern south Pacific population.

Other 
Among Northern Indian Ocean and Bay of Bengal, such as along Sri Lanka, India, and Malaysia, sightings and older records of fin whales exist.

Antarctica 
Relatively little is known about the historical and current population levels of the southern fin whale. The IWC officially estimates that the Southern Hemisphere pre-whaling population was 400,000 whales and that the population in 1979 (at the cessation of Antarctic large scale whaling) was 85,200. Both the current and historical estimates should be considered as poor estimates because the methodology and data used in the study are known to be flawed. Other estimates cite current size to be between 15,000 (1983) and 38,000 (1997). As of 2006, there is no scientifically accepted estimate of current population or trends in abundance.

Predation 
The only known predator of the fin whale is the killer whale, with at least 20 eyewitness and second-hand accounts of attack or harassment. They usually flee and offer little resistance to attack. Only a few confirmed fatalities have occurred. In October 2005, 16 killer whales attacked and killed a fin whale in the Canal de Ballenas, Gulf of California, after chasing it for about an hour. They fed on its sinking carcass for about 15 minutes before leaving the area. In June 2012, a pod of killer whales was seen in La Paz Bay, in the Gulf of California, chasing a fin whale for over an hour before finally killing it and feeding on its carcass. The whale bore numerous tooth rakes over its back and dorsal fin; several killer whales flanked it on either side, with one individual visible under water biting at its right lower jaw. In July 1908, a whaler reportedly saw two killer whales attack and kill a fin whale off western Greenland. In January 1984, seven were seen from the air circling, holding the flippers, and ramming a fin whale in the Gulf of California, but the observation ended at nightfall.

Feeding 

The fin whale is a filter-feeder, feeding on small schooling fish, squid and crustaceans including copepods and krill. In the North Pacific, they feed on krill in the genera Euphausia, Thysanoessa, and Nyctiphanes, large copepods in the genus Neocalanus, small schooling fish (e.g. the genera Engraulis, Mallotus, Clupea, and Theragra), and squid. Based on stomach content analysis of over 19,500 fin whales caught by the Japanese whaling fleet in the North Pacific from 1952 to 1971, 64.1% contained only krill, 25.5% copepods, 5.0% fish, 3.4% krill and copepods and 1.7% squid. Nemoto (1959) analyzed the stomach contents of about 7500 fin whales caught in the northern North Pacific and Bering Sea from 1952 to 1958, found that they mainly preyed on euphausiids around the Aleutian Islands and in the Gulf of Alaska and schooling fish in the northern Bering Sea and off Kamchatka. In the northern Bering Sea (north of 58°N), their main prey species were capelin (Mallotus villosus), Alaska pollock (Theragra chalcogramma) and Pacific herring (Clupea pallasii); they also consumed saffron cod (Eleginus gracilis). Arctic krill (Thysanoessa raschii) was the only species of euphausiid found in the stomachs of fin whales in the northern Bering Sea. Off Kamchatka, they appeared to primarily feed on herring. They also took large quantities of the copepod Neocalanus cristatus around the Aleutian Islands and in Olyutor Bay off northeast Kamchatka, areas where the species was abundant. Five species of euphausiid (Euphausia pacifica, Thysanoessa spinifera, T. inermis, T. raschii, and T. longipes) were the predominant prey around the Aleutian Islands and in the Gulf of Alaska. Prey varied by region in the Kuril Islands area, with euphausiids (T. longipes, T. inermis, and T. raschii) and copepods (Neocalanus plumchrus and N. cristatus) being the main prey in the northern area and Japanese flying squid (Todarodes pacificus pacificus) and small schooling fish (e.g. Pacific saury, Cololabis saira; and Japanese anchovy, Engraulis japonicus) dominating the diet in the southern area.

Of the fin whale stomachs sampled off British Columbia between 1963 and 1967, euphausiids dominated the diet for four of the five years (82.3 to 100% of the diet), while copepods only formed a major portion of the diet in 1965 (35.7%). Miscellaneous fish, squid, and octopus played only a very minor part of the diet in two of the five years (3.6 to 4.8%). Fin whales caught off California between 1959 and 1970 fed on the pelagic euphausiid Euphausia pacifica (86% of sampled individuals), the more neritic euphausiid Thysanoessa spinifera (9%), and the northern anchovy (Engraulis mordax) (7%); only trace amounts (<0.5% each) were found of Pacific saury (C. saira) and juvenile rockfish (Sebastes jordani). In the Gulf of California, they have been observed feeding on swarms of the euphausiid Nyctiphanes simplex.

In the North Atlantic, they prey on euphausiids in the genera Meganyctiphanes, Thysanoessa and Nyctiphanes and small schooling fish (e.g. the genera Clupea, Mallotus, and Ammodytes). Of the 1,609 fin whale stomachs examined at the Hvalfjörður whaling station in southwestern Iceland from 1967 to 1989 (caught between June and September), 96% contained only krill, 2.5% krill and fish, 0.8% some fish remains, 0.7% capelin (M. villosus), and 0.1% sandeel (family Ammodytidae); a small proportion of (mainly juvenile) blue whiting (Micromesistius poutassou) were also found. Of the krill sampled between 1979 and 1989, the vast majority (over 99%) was northern krill (Meganyctiphanes norvegica); only one stomach contained Thysanoessa longicaudata. Off West Greenland, 75% of the fin whales caught between July and October had consumed krill (family Euphausiidae), 17% capelin (Mallotus) and 8% sand lance (Ammodytes sp.). Off eastern Newfoundland, they chiefly feed on capelin, but also take small quantities of euphausiids (mostly T. raschii and T. inermis).

In the Southern Hemisphere, they feed almost exclusively on euphausiids (mainly the genera Euphausia and Thysanoessa), as well as taking small amounts of amphipods (e.g. Themisto gaudichaudii) and various species of fish. Of the more than 16,000 fin whales caught by the Japanese whaling fleet in the Southern Hemisphere between 1961 and 1965 that contained food in their stomachs, 99.4% fed on euphausiids, 0.5% on fish, and 0.1% on amphipods. In the Southern Ocean they mainly consume E. superba.

It then closes its jaws and pushes the water back out of its mouth through its baleen, which allows the water to leave while trapping the prey. An adult has between 262 and 473 baleen plates on each side of the mouth. Each plate is made of keratin that frays out into fine hairs on the ends inside the mouth near the tongue.

The whale routinely dives to depths of more than  where it executes an average of four "lunges", to accumulate krill. If prey patches are not sufficiently dense, or are located too deep in the water, the whale has to spend a larger portion of its day searching for food. One hunting technique is to circle schools of fish at high speed, frightening the fish into a tight ball, then turning on its side before engulfing the massed prey.

Parasites, epibiotics, and pathology 
Fin whales suffer from a number of pathological conditions. The parasitic copepod Pennella balaenopterae—usually found on the flank of fin whales—burrows into their blubber to feed on their blood, while the pseudo-stalked barnacle Xenobalanus globicipitis is generally found more often on the dorsal fin, pectoral fins, and flukes.

Other barnacles found on fin whales include the acorn barnacle Coronula reginae and the stalked barnacle Conchoderma auritum, which attaches to Coronula or the baleen. The harpacticid copepod Balaenophilus unisetus (heavy infestations of which have been found in fin whales caught off northwestern Spain) and the ciliate Haematophagus also infest the baleen, the former feeding on the baleen itself and the latter on red blood cells.

The remora Remora australis and occasionally the amphipod Cyamus balaenopterae can also be found on fin whales, both feeding on the skin. Infestations of the giant nematode Crassicauda boopis can cause inflammation of the renal arteries and potential kidney failure, while the smaller C. crassicauda infects the lower urinary tract. Out of 87 whales taken and necropsied from the North Atlantic, infection from Crassicauda boopis was found to be very prevalent and invasive, indicating high probability that it was responsible for causing death in these whales. C. boopis was found in 94% of the whales examined. The worms were usually enveloped by "exuberant tissue reactions which in some whales obstructed multiple renal veins". The parasite was most likely by environmental contamination, involving shedding of larvae in urine. Major inflammatory lesions in the mesenteric arteries suggested that the worm larvae were ingested and migrated to the kidney.

These observations suggest that infection from C. boopis can be "lethal by inducing congestive renal failure". Injury to the vascular system is also a result of moderate infections. Therefore, the implication can be made that the feeding migration of fin whales every year in circumpolar waters can be associated with pathologic risk.

An emaciated  female fin whale, which stranded along the Belgian coast in 1997, was found to be infected with lesions of Morbillivirus. In January 2011, a  emaciated adult male fin whale stranded dead on the Tyrrhenian coastline of Italy was found to be infected with Morbillivirus and the protozoa Toxoplasma gondii, as well as carrying heavy loads of organochlorine pollutants.

Human interaction

Whaling 

In the 19th century, the fin whale was occasionally hunted by open-boat whalers, but it was relatively safe, because it could easily outrun ships of the time and often sank when killed, making the pursuit a waste of time for whalers. However, the later introduction of steam-powered boats and harpoons that exploded on impact made it possible to kill and secure them along with blue and sei whales on an industrial scale. As other whale species became overhunted, the whaling industry turned to the still-abundant fin whale as a substitute. It was primarily hunted for its blubber, oil, and baleen. Around 704,000 fin whales were caught in Antarctic whaling operations alone between 1904 and 1975.

The introduction of factory ships with stern slipways in 1925 substantially increased the number of whales taken per year. In 1937–38 alone, over 29,000 fin whales were taken. From 1953–54 to 1961–62, the catch averaged over 30,000 per year. By 1962–63, sei whale catches began to increase as fin whales became scarce. By 1975–76, fewer than 1,000 fin whales were being caught each year. In the North Pacific, over 74,000 fin whales were caught between 1910 and 1975. Between 1910 and 1989, over 55,000 were caught in the North Atlantic. Coastal groups in northeast Asian waters, along with many other baleen species, were likely driven into serious perils or functional extinctions by industrial catches by Japan covering wide ranges of China and Korean EEZ within very short period in 20th century. Migrations of the species into Japanese EEZ and in East China Sea were likely to be exterminated relatively earlier, as the last catch records on Amami Ōshima was between the 1910s and 1930s. After the cease of exploiting Asian stocks, Japan kept mass commercial and illegal hunts until 1975. Several thousand individuals were hunted from various stations mainly along coasts of Hokkaido, Sanriku, and the Gotō Islands.

The IWC prohibited hunting in the Southern Hemisphere in 1976. The Soviet Union engaged in the illegal killing of protected whale species in the North Pacific and Southern Hemisphere, over-reporting fin whale catches to cover up illegal takes of other species. In the North Pacific, they reported taking over 10,000 fin whales between 1961 and 1979, while the true catch was less than 9,000. In the Southern Hemisphere, they reported taking nearly 53,000 between 1948 and 1973, when the true total was a little over 41,000. The fin whale was given full protection from commercial whaling by the IWC in the North Pacific in 1976, and in the North Atlantic in 1987, with small exceptions for aboriginal catches and catches for research purposes. All populations worldwide remain listed as endangered species by the US National Marine Fisheries Service and the International Conservation Union Red List. The fin whale is on Appendix 1 of CITES.

The IWC has set a quota of 19 fin whales per year for Greenland. Meat and other products from whales killed in these hunts are widely marketed within Greenland, but export is illegal. Iceland and Norway are not bound by the IWC's moratorium on commercial whaling because both countries filed objections to it.

In October 2006, Iceland's fisheries ministry authorized the hunting of 9 fin whales through August 2007. In 2009 and 2010, Iceland caught 125 and 148 fin whales, respectively. An Icelandic company, Hvalur, caught over a hundred fin whales in 2014, and exported a record quantity of 2071 tonnes in a single shipment in 2014. Since 2006, Hvalur has caught more than 500 fin whales and exported more than 5000 tonnes of whale meat to Japan.

In the Southern Hemisphere, Japan permits annual takes of 10 fin whales under its Antarctic Special Permit whaling program for the 2005–2006 and 2006–2007 seasons. The proposal for 2007–2008 and the subsequent 12 seasons allows taking 50 per year. While 10 fin whales were caught in the 2005–06 season and three in the 2006–07 season, none were caught in the 2007–2008 season. A single fin whale was caught in both the 2008–09 and 2009–10 seasons, two were taken in the 2010–11 season, and one was taken in the 2011–12 season.

Fin whales have been targets of illegal captures using harpoons for dolphin hunts or intentionally drive whales into nets.

Ship interaction 
Collisions with ships are a major cause of mortality. In some areas, they cause a substantial portion of large whale strandings. Most serious injuries are caused by large, fast-moving ships over or near continental shelves.

A 60-foot-long fin whale was found stuck on the bow of a container ship in New York harbour on 12 April 2014.

Two dead fin whales, one 65 feet and one 25 feet, were discovered stuck to the Australian destroyer HMAS Sydney in May 2021 when the ship arrived in Naval Base San Diego.

Ship collisions frequently occur in Tsushima Strait and result in damaging all of whales, passengers, and vessels, hence the Japanese Coast Guard has started visual recordings of large cetaceans in Tsushima Strait to inform operating vessels in the areas.

Museums 
Several fin whale skeletons are exhibited in North America. The Natural History Museum of Los Angeles County in Los Angeles, California has an exhibit entitled the "Fin Whale Passage", which displays a  fin whale skeleton collected by former museum osteologist Eugene Fischer and field collector Howard Hill in 1926 from the Trinidad whaling station (1920–1926) in Humboldt County, northern California. A steel armature supports the skeleton, which is accompanied by sculpted flukes. Science North, a science museum in Greater Sudbury, Ontario, Canada, has a  fin whale skeleton collected from Anticosti Island hanging from the fourth floor of its main building. A  skeleton hangs in the atrium (renovated in 2019–2020) of the science-mathematics building at Knox College (Illinois) in Galesburg, Illinois. Perhaps the largest fin whale skeleton exhibited is at The Grand Rapids Public Museum in Grand Rapids, Michigan, where a  skeleton in the Galleria section hangs from the ceiling. Several fin whale skeletons are also exhibited in Europe. The Natural History Museum of Slovenia in Ljubljana, Slovenia, houses a  female fin whale skeleton—the specimen had been found floating in the Gulf of Piran in the spring of 2003. The Hungarian Natural History Museum in Budapest, Hungary, displays a fin whale skeleton hanging near its main entrance which had been caught in the Atlantic Ocean in 1896 and purchased from Vienna in 1900. The Cambridge University Museum of Zoology, in Cambridge, United Kingdom, exhibits a nearly  male fin whale skeleton, which had stranded at Pevensey, East Sussex, in November 1865.

The Otago Museum, in Dunedin, New Zealand, displays a  fin whale skeleton, which had stranded on the beach at Nelson at the entrance of the Waimea River in 1882.

A 20m fin whale skeleton is exhibited at Van Thuy Tu Temple in Phan Thiết, Vietnam, where some local fishermen worship whales as near-divine beings who offer protection from storms.

Whale watching 

Fin whales are regularly encountered on whale-watching excursions worldwide. In the Southern California Bight, fin whales are encountered year-round, with the best sightings between November and March. They can even be seen from land (for example, from Point Vicente, Palos Verdes, where they can be seen lunge feeding at the surface only a half mile to a few miles offshore). They are regularly sighted in the summer and fall in the Gulf of St. Lawrence, the Gulf of Maine, the Bay of Fundy, the Bay of Biscay, Strait of Gibraltar, and the Mediterranean. In southern Ireland, they are seen inshore from June to February, with peak sightings in November and December.

Conservation 

The fin whale is listed on both Appendix I and Appendix II of the Convention on the Conservation of Migratory Species of Wild Animals (CMS).

In addition, the fin whale is covered by the Agreement on the Conservation of Cetaceans in the Black Sea, Mediterranean Sea and Contiguous Atlantic Area (ACCOBAMS) and the Memorandum of Understanding for the Conservation of Cetaceans and Their Habitats in the Pacific Islands Region (Pacific Cetaceans MOU).

Overhunting is the primary threat to the population. Currently modern whaling technologies have caused a massive decline in fin whale numbers. They are also threatened by vessel collisions, particularly in the Mediterranean Sea where collisions comprise a large part of fin whale mortalities. Fin whales occasionally get killed from entanglement and sometimes fishing gear. Military sonar can be problematic for fin whales and the way they communicate during the breeding season, possibly causing a decrease in birth rates. 

The International Whaling Commission has set a zero limit for fin whale catches in the North Pacific and southern hemisphere since 1976.

See also 
 Baleen whale
 Endangered species
 List of cetaceans

References

Further reading 

 Peter Saundry. 2011. Fin whale. Encyclopedia of Earth. National Council for Science and the Environment. Washington DC . C. Michael Hogan Ed. Content partner: Encyclopedia of Life
 National Audubon Society Guide to Marine Mammals of the World, Reeves, Stewart, Clapham and Powell, 
 Whales & Dolphins Guide to the Biology and Behaviour of Cetaceans, Maurizio Wurtz and Nadia Repetto. 
 Encyclopedia of Marine Mammals, editors Perrin, Wursig and Thewissen,

External links 

 US National Marine Fisheries Service fin whale web page
 ARKive – images and videos of the fin whale (Balaenoptera physalus)
 Finback whale sounds
 Photograph of a fin whale underwater
 Photographs of a fin whale breaching
 World Wide Fund for Nature (WWF) – species profile for the fin whale
 Voices in the Sea – Sounds of the Fin Whale

fin whale
Cosmopolitan mammals
EDGE species
ESA endangered species
fin whale
fin whale